Matter is the second studio album by New York-based act St. Lucia. It was released on January 29, 2016 via Columbia Records.

Track listing

Personnel
Credits adapted from the liner notes.

Musicians

St. Lucia – vocals
Ross Clark – guitar, bass guitar
Patricia Beranek – keyboards, percussion, vocals
Nicholas Paul - Piano, Keyboards
Dustin Kaufman – drums
Chris Zane – drums
Tim Vaughn – trombone
Johnathon Powell – trumpet
John Carlson – trumpet
John Natchez – saxophone, flute
Tim Sullivan – saxophone

Technical

Jean-Philip Grobler – engineering, production
Andrew Lappin - engineering
Chris Zane – engineering, mixing, additional production
Jack Antonoff – programming, editing
Andy Baldwin – drum engineering, mixing
Benjamin Gebert – production

Additional personnel

Derek Davies – A&R
Andrew Keller – A&R
Lizzy Plapinger – A&R
Jeff Gilligan – art direction, design
Lauren Mortimer – Illustration

References

2016 albums
Columbia Records albums
St. Lucia (musician) albums